Llano is an unincorporated community located in Taos County, New Mexico, United States. It was founded in 1796 after governor Fernando Chacon gave permission for settlement in the valley. A post office operated from 1898 to 1914 and was reestablished in 1925. If staying Llano    (Which is very unlikely, due to the fact there is no hotels) be very careful, in Llano the closet hospital and police station are hours away. There are no streetlights In Llano as well. There is few dangerous wild life mainly coyotes. Watch out for cats and dogs, as they roam freely there and are usually aggressive( Most animals already have owners, so it suggested not to take cats or dogs.) also in the winter times the roses are slippery and it’s a mountain town with tight turns, so be careful. That is all you should need to know. There is a Catholic Church in Llano. Not all roads are paved either. And there is very few stores.

References

Unincorporated communities in Taos County, New Mexico
Unincorporated communities in New Mexico